Gaddafi Stadium, previously known as Lahore Stadium is a cricket stadium in Lahore, Pakistan and the home ground of Lahore Qalandars. It is owned by the Pakistan Cricket Board (PCB). With a capacity of 27,000, it is the fourth largest cricket stadium of Pakistan. Gaddafi Stadium was the first in Pakistan to be equipped with modern floodlights having their own standby power generators. The headquarters of the Pakistan Cricket Board are situated at Gaddafi Stadium, thus making it the home of the Pakistan national cricket team.

It was designed by Russian-born Pakistan architect and civil engineer Nasreddin Murat-Khan, and constructed by Mian Abdul Khaliq and Company in 1959. The stadium was renovated for the 1996 Cricket World Cup when it hosted the final.

In addition to Pakistan home games and international matches, the Gaddafi Stadium has also hosted several matches of the Pakistan Super League, with the first one being the final of the 2017 edition. In March 2022, the PCB began the process to change the name of the Gaddafi Stadium to the name of a new sponsor for financial reasons.

History

Construction 

The stadium was built in 1959 and was designed by architect and civil engineer Nasreddin Murat-Khan and construction was completed by Mian Abdul Khaliq and Company. It was originally established as the Lahore Stadium.

Renaming stadium 
 
In 1974, the ground was renamed in honour of the former Libyan leader Muammar Gaddafi following a speech he gave at the 2nd Organisation of the Islamic Conference meeting in Lahore in favour of Pakistan's right to pursue nuclear weapons. On 23 October 2011, Pakistan Cricket Board discussed renaming the stadium following the death of Gaddafi, to support the new government in Libya. 
The Punjab Olympic Association made a similar request in late October 2011 to the provincial chief minister. Association secretary Idrees Haider Khawaja said, "I don't think his profile is inspirational enough to link with our cricket stadium's identity." However, the stadium's name was not changed.

Redesigned 

In 1995–96, the Gaddafi Stadium was renovated by architect Nayyar Ali Dada, who was qualified from National College of Arts, for the 1996 Cricket World Cup. Dada's redesign was done with red, hand-laid brickwork and arches. Dada also had plastic seating installed in place of the existing concrete benches. The lower portion under the stands was enclosed and converted to shops for boutiques and offices. Gaddafi Stadium, being the largest cricket stadium in Pakistan, used to have capacity of 65,250 spectators, until the redesigning of its enclosures reduced the capacity to 27,000.

Cricket history

International cricket history 
In both 1968 and 1977, Test matches played against England were affected by riots.

In 1976 the first of three hat-tricks was taken at the stadium, by Peter Petherick of New Zealand against Pakistan on 9 October. The next was taken by Wasim Akram of Pakistan against Sri Lanka, 6 March 1999, and the third by Mohammad Sami of Pakistan against Sri Lanka.

Pakistan has enjoyed some memorable moments on the ground, including a fifth-wicket stand of 281 between Javed Miandad and Asif Iqbal against New Zealand in 1976 and an innings and 324 run win against New Zealand in 2002.

2009 Sri Lankan team attack 
On 3 March 2009, the scheduled third day of second Test of 2008–09 Sri Lanka tour of Pakistan, the Sri Lankan team's convoy was attacked by armed militants at Liberty Roundabout, near Gaddafi Stadium. Eight Sri Lankan players were injured, including Sri Lankan captain, Mahela Jayawardene. The Sri Lankan team was air-lifted from Gaddafi Stadium to a nearby airbase, from where they were evacuated back to Sri Lanka. This event marked brought a halt to international cricket in Pakistan.

Return of international cricket 
International cricket returned to Pakistan on 19 May 2015, when the Zimbabwe cricket team landed at the Allama Iqbal International Airport to become the first Full Member nation to tour Pakistan since the attack. Pakistan won both ODI and T20I series comfortably.

In August 2017, PCB along with ICC started to improve international cricket in Pakistan. With that, under heavy security, PCB planned World XI tour to Pakistan for three T20Is.

In August 2017, Thilanga Sumathipala, president of Sri Lanka Cricket, said that he would like to play at least one of the three T20I matches in Lahore, Pakistan during October. In March 2009, the Sri Lanka cricket team were attacked by terrorists while travelling to the Gaddafi Stadium in Lahore. Since then, the only Test side to visit Pakistan has been Zimbabwe, when they toured during May 2015. Two of Sri Lanka's current team, Chamara Kapugedera and Suranga Lakmal were on the bus during the 2009 terrorist attack, and both could have been selected for the T20I squad for this series.

In September 2017, the fixtures were confirmed, with the final T20I match of the series scheduled to be played in Lahore. Sri Lanka Cricket said that players have a "contractual obligation" to play the match in Lahore, but it was unlikely to issue penalties to any player who chose not to visit Pakistan. However, on 14 October 2017, the Sri Lankan team expressed their reluctance to travel to Pakistan, requesting that the fixture is moved to a neutral venue. On 16 October 2017, Sri Lanka Cricket confirmed that the fixture in Lahore would go ahead as planned, but their limited-overs captain, Upul Tharanga, had pulled out of the match. Despite the concerns from the players, team manager Asanka Gurusinha felt that a competitive squad would be named. On 19 October 2017, Sri Lanka's chief selector, Graham Labrooy, said that players who do not travel to Lahore would be unlikely to be selected for the other two T20I fixtures. The squad for the T20I fixtures was named two days later, with Thisara Perera selected as captain.

The Sri Lankan squad arrived in Lahore under "extraordinary" security and made their way to the team's hotel in a bomb-proof bus. Ahead of the T20I in Lahore, Cricket Sri Lanka's president Thilanga Sumathipala said that the team was privileged to be in Pakistan and that he would help support the country in hosting more tours. Najam Sethi, chairman of the PCB, said that this fixture would be the start of international cricket returning to the country, with him expecting every country to play in Pakistan by the end of 2020. Pakistan went on to win the T20I series 3–0.

A T20I match scheduled to be played against Bangladesh on 27 January 2020 at the Gaddafi stadium was abandoned without a ball being bowled due to heavy rain.

The venue also hosted three main matches as a part of the 2018 Blind Cricket World Cup.

Domestic cricket history 

On 5 March 2017, the final of the 2017 Pakistan Super League was played in the stadium, the first time a PSL fixture was being played in Pakistan. After the success of holding the final, the Pakistan Cricket Board decided to play two games of the 2018 Pakistan Super League in Pakistan. In September 2019, the Pakistan Cricket Board named it as one of the venues to host matches in the 2019–20 Quaid-e-Azam Trophy.

Records

Test 
 Highest team total: 699/5, by Pakistan against India in 1989.

 Lowest team total: 73, by New Zealand against Pakistan in 2002.
 Highest individual score: 329, by Inzamam-ul-Haq against New Zealand in 2002.

One Day International 
 Highest team total: 375/3, by Pakistan against Zimbabwe, 26 May 2015.
 Lowest team total: 75, by Pakistan against Sri Lanka, 22 January 2009.
 Highest individual score: 139*, by Ijaz Ahmed against India, 2 October 1997.

T20 International 
 Highest team total: 209/3, by England against Pakistan, 2 October 2022.
 Lowest team total: 101, by Pakistan against Sri Lanka, 5 October 2019.
 Highest individual score: 104*, by Mohammad Rizwan against South Africa, 11 February 2021.

Cricket World Cup 
This stadium hosted six One Day International (ODI) matches during 1987 Cricket World Cup and 1996 Cricket World Cup, including the final between Sri Lanka and Australia.

1987 Cricket World Cup

1996 Cricket World Cup

See also 
 2009 attack on the Sri Lanka national cricket team
 List of Test cricket grounds
 List of international cricket centuries at Gaddafi Stadium
 List of international five-wicket hauls at Gaddafi Stadium
 List of stadiums in Pakistan
 List of sports venues in Lahore
 List of cricket grounds by capacity

References

External links 

Cricinfo.com ground profile
List of all Test matches played at Gaddafi Stadium, Lahore
List of all ODI matches played at Gaddafi Stadium, Lahore
Google Maps satellite photo of Gaddafi Stadium

Test cricket grounds in Pakistan
Cricket in Lahore
Muammar Gaddafi
Tourist attractions in Lahore
Stadiums in Pakistan
Cricket grounds in Pakistan
1959 establishments in Pakistan
Nasreddin Murat-Khan buildings and structures
Nayyar Ali Dada buildings and structures
1996 Cricket World Cup stadiums
Libya–Pakistan relations
1987 Cricket World Cup stadiums